Events from the year 1998 in art.

Events
April – Fans of Newcastle United F.C. decorate the newly erected Angel of the North sculpture with a giant replica of Alan Shearer's no. 9 shirt.  Police remove the shirt after about twenty minutes.
3 December – 44 governments participating in the Washington Conference on Holocaust-Era Assets approve the Washington Principles on Nazi-Confiscated Art (or "Washington Declaration"), requiring efforts to be made to restore looted art to its original owners or their heirs.
Gemäldegalerie, Berlin (in the Kulturforum), designed by Heinz Hilmer and Christoph Sattler, opens.

Exhibitions
1 November – Jackson Pollock retrospective opens at MoMA.

Awards
Archibald Prize – Lewis Miller, Portrait of Allan Mitelman No 3
Arts & Cultural Council for Greater Rochester Artist of the Year – Wendell Castle
Gran Prix d'Antoine Pevsner – Constantine Andreou
Hugo Boss Prize – Douglas Gordon
Turner Prize – Chris Ofili

Works

Mark Calderon – Floribunda (bronze, Portland, Oregon)
Alan Collins – Legacy of Leadership (bronze, Berrien Springs, Michigan)
Michael Condron – Martian tripod (Woking, England)
Martin Creed – Work No 200: Half the air in a given space
Anthony Gormley – Angel of the North
David Hockney – A Bigger Grand Canyon
Mary Miss - Framing Union Square in the 14th Street–Union Square station in New York City
Ron Mueck – Ghost
Chris Ofili – No Woman No Cry
Valerie Otani – Folly Bollards (bronzes, Portland, Oregon)
Stephen Robin – Federal Triangle Flowers (sculptures, Washington, D.C.)
Piotr Uklański - The Nazis
Rachel Whiteread – Water Tower (New York City)

Publications

 A hoax biography, launched on 1 April.

Deaths
23 January – Victor Pasmore, English artist and architect (b. 1908)
29 January - Karin Jonzen, British sculptor (b. 1914)
7 March – Karen Holtsmark, Norwegian painter (b. 1907)
12 March – Beatrice Wood, American artist and ceramicist (b. 1893)
13 March – Bill Reid, Canadian artist (b. 1920)
7 April – James McIntosh Patrick, Scottish landscape painter (b. 1907)
25 April – Wright Morris, American novelist, photographer, and essayist (b. 1910)
3 May – Otto Bettmann, German American image archivist (b. 1903)
6 May – Sybil Connolly, Welsh-Irish fashion designer (b. 1921)
18 May – Enid Marx, English textile designer (b. 1902)
June – Kali, Polish-American portrait painter and Polish Resistance agent during World War II (b. 1918)
8 October – Zhang Chongren, Chinese artist and sculptor (b. 1907)
25 October – Dick Higgins, English composer, poet, printer and early Fluxus artist (b. 1938)
3 November – Bob Kane, American comic book artist and writer (b. 1915)
2 December – Brian Stonehouse, English painter and Special Operations Executive agent during World War II (b. 1918)
30 December – Joan Brossa, Catalan poet, playwright, graphic designer and plastic artist (b. 1919)
Claude Serre, French cartoonist (b. 1938)
Wolf Vostell, German painter and sculptor (b. 1932)

References

 
Years of the 20th century in art
1990s in art